is a railway station on the Tokyo Metro Tozai Line in Urayasu, Chiba, Japan, operated by the Tokyo subway operator Tokyo Metro. Its station number is T-18.

Lines
Urayasu Station is served by the Tokyo Metro Tozai Line.

Station layout
The station has two elevated side platforms.

History
The station opened on 29 March 1969, and consists of two elevated side platforms.

The station facilities were inherited by Tokyo Metro after the privatization of the Teito Rapid Transit Authority (TRTA) in 2004.

References

External links

 Tokyo Metro station information 

Railway stations in Chiba Prefecture
Stations of Tokyo Metro
Tokyo Metro Tozai Line
Railway stations in Japan opened in 1969
Urayasu, Chiba